Delécluse is a French surname. People with this surname include:

 Auguste Joseph Delécluse (1855-1928), French painter and founder of the Académie Delécluse
 Jacques Delécluse (1933–2015), French percussionist and composer 
 Ulysse Delécluse (1907–1995), French clarinetist and professor at the Paris Conservatory

See also
Étienne-Jean Delécluze, French painter